Kalyana Rathriyil is a 1966 Indian Malayalam-language crime thriller film directed by M. Krishnan Nair and produced by M. Raju Mathan. The film stars Prem Nazir, Adoor Bhasi, Muthukulam Raghavan Pillai and T. S. Muthaiah. It is the first Malayalam film to receive an A (adults only) certificate.

Plot

Cast 
Prem Nazir as Rajagopal
Adoor Bhasi as Appukuttan
Muthukulam Raghavan Pillai
T. S. Muthaiah as PK Menon
Kaduvakkulam Antony
Kottarakkara Sreedharan Nair as KB Nair
Latha
N. Saroja
Paravoor Bharathan
Philomina as Madhavi Amma
Vijaya Nirmala as Radha

Soundtrack 
The music was composed by G. Devarajan and the lyrics were written by Vayalar Ramavarma.

References

External links 
 

1960s crime thriller films
1960s Malayalam-language films
1966 films
Films directed by M. Krishnan Nair
Indian crime thriller films